The Third Abe cabinet governed Japan under the leadership of the prime minister, Shinzō Abe, from December 2014 to November 2017. The government was a coalition between the Liberal Democratic Party and the Komeito (which had changed its name from "New Komeito" in the 2012–2014 term) and controlled both the upper and lower houses of the National Diet.

Following the 2017 general election, the Third Abe cabinet was dissolved on November 1, 2017, and it was replaced by the Fourth Abe cabinet.

Background
Following the snap "Abenomics Dissolution" and general election of 2014, Abe was re-elected by the Diet and chose to retain all the ministers from his previous cabinet except the defense minister, Akinori Eto, who had been involved in a money scandal. Abe explained that he aimed to avoid the disruption of another major personnel change only three months after the September cabinet reshuffle.

Abe conducted three reshuffles of his third administration. The first took place in October 2015 following his re-election to another three-year term as president of the LDP and the launch of his "Abenomics 2.0" policies. The second reshuffle occurred in August 2016, following the victory of the ruling coalition in the July 2016 upper house elections, the first time since 1989 that the LDP held an outright majority in the House of Councillors. The third reshuffle occurred in August 2017.

Election of the prime minister

Lists of ministers 

R = Member of the House of Representatives
C = Member of the House of Councillors

Cabinet

Changes 
 February 23, 2015 – The agriculture minister, Koya Nishikawa, resigned because of a campaign finance scandal. His immediate predecessor, Yoshimasa Hayashi, was recalled to replace him.
 June 25, 2015 – A new position of minister for the Olympics was created. Toshiaki Endo was appointed the inaugural minister.

First reshuffled cabinet

Changes 
 January 28, 2016 – The economic revitalization minister, Akira Amari, resignedbecause of a bribery scandal and was replaced with Nobuteru Ishihara.
 July 2016 – The justice minister, Mitsuhide Iwaki, and the Okinawa minister, Aiko Shimajiri, lost their seats in the House of Councillors election but remained in office as ministers until the August cabinet reshuffle.

Second reshuffled cabinet

Changes 
 April 26, 2017 – The reconstruction minister, Masahiro Imamura, was dismissed because of comments he made about the 2011 Tōhoku earthquake and tsunami and was replaced by Masayoshi Yoshino.
 July 28, 2017 – The defense minister, Tomomi Inada, resigned.

Third reshuffled cabinet

References

External links 
Pages at the Kantei (English website):
List of Ministers December 2014 – October 2015
List of Ministers October 2015 – August 2016
List of Ministers August 2016 – August 2017
List of Ministers August 2017 – November 2017

Cabinet of Japan
2014 establishments in Japan
2017 disestablishments in Japan
Cabinets established in 2014
Cabinets disestablished in 2017
2014 in Japanese politics
Shinzo Abe